Elvenking may refer to:

 Elvenking (Middle-earth), a character in J. R. R. Tolkien's legendarium
 Elvenking (band), an Italian folk/power metal band
 Erlking, a german/danish folklore fairy
 Erlkönig, a poem by Goethe